EN57 (manufacturer's designation: Pafawag 5B/6B) is an electric multiple unit used by the Polish railway operator (PKP). It was built for suburban and long-distance services. Presently it is used by Przewozy Regionalne (Polregio), Łódzka Kolej Aglomeracyjna, SKM Trójmiasto, Koleje Dolnośląskie, Koleje Śląskie and Koleje Mazowieckie companies in Poland.

History 

Designed for regional transport, class EN57 was based on the earlier class EW55 units. EW55 were the first electrical multiple units built in Poland with 100% domestic components. They were built by Pafawag works in Wrocław.

Production started in 1962 and ended in 1993 with 1452 trainsets produced, many of which are still in operation. This class is believed to have had the longest production period in the world for electric multiple units.
The first-generation units had first-class compartments, but units numbered 602 and upwards were produced with only second class. Due to very long production period, the series varies between specific production spans. Units up to number 1113 have corrugated sides and three windscreens, units numbered 1114 to 1825 (second-generation) have flat sides and three windscreens, whilst units from number 1900 up to 1953 (third-generation) have flat sides and two windscreens, resembling class EW58 units.

Classes EN71, ED72, and ED73 units were based on class EN57. SKM Trójmiasto which operates service in the Tricity area uses these units and has also modernised them, mostly to the interior.

As a result of several fires and accidents, units numbered 201 to 206 were assembled from surviving cars of previously destroyed units. Since 2006, many EN57 units have been modernised with funding from the European Union. The changes affect the appearance of the units, with the ends being redesigned. The interior was also changed, and air-conditioning retrofit was done on many of said modernisations. Mechanical and electric devices remain mostly unchanged. Modified units are being renumbered from 2001 upwards.

Technical data 
EN57 is a three-car electric multiple unit with traction motors located in the middle car. The outer two cars are both driving trailers and do not have motors. Trailers are distinguished with letters a and b, with part a including compressor and part b including the batteries.

Each part of the unit consists of three compartments, divided by corridors. In the trailers only two compartments are for passenger accommodation, while the third was thought to be luggage compartment. In the motor car, all three compartments are used by passengers. Previously, there were on-board toilets in all parts of the unit, but due to several fires caused by neighbouring electric devices, as well as their compressor inlets originally being located next to the toilets (hence spreading the odours around, likely leading to the "kibel" [lit. crapper] nickname applied since at least the 1980s), the toilets in the motor cars were removed. Class EN57 is capable of multiple unit operation with two or three units, using Scharfenberg couplers to connect units together.  Each unit can seat up to 212 passengers.

Service in other countries 

Three class EN57 units were exported to SFR Yugoslavia in 1964, where they were classified 311-0 (for trailers) and 315-0 (for motor cars). Another eleven were subsequently rebuilt from class 315-1 with additional fourth trailers. These units later remained in service in Slovenia and Croatia as SŽ 311/315 and HŽ 6011 respectively, until they were respectively withdrawn from service in 2021 and 2009. As in the time of delivery Władysław Gomułka was the leader of the Polish United Workers' Party, those units were nicknamed after him.

Rebuilds and refurbishments

Exterior and interior (2006–2018) 
Between 2006 and 2018, many extensive EN57 rebuilds were undertaken in which the driver's cab exteriors and headlights/taillights were replaced into new designs, extending their lifespans by 15–20 years. These rebuilt trains are typically nicknamed "turbokibel" (lit. "turbocrapper").

SPOT and EN57-20XX 

In 2006, ZNTK "Mińsk Mazowiecki", Pesa Bydgoszcz and Newag Nowy Sącz begin rebuilding 75 EN57 EMUs under the SPOT programme, financed by European Union funds. The appearance of the end walls, cab driver and interior was changed. The separate service compartments were removed by connecting them with entrance hallways. The modernised EMU was adapted to the needs of disabled people through the installation of elevators for wheelchairs and bigger toilets. EMUs after modernisation had also installed alarms and 16 cameras. The original spinning transformer was replaced by an electronic transformer supplying 110 V DC, 230 V AC and 24 V DC power. These trainsets were given the numbering range 2001–2075, which was later changed to 2004–2078.

EN57KM 

In 2007 SKM Trójmiasto and Koleje Mazowieckie decided to apply the start pulse in some of their rebuilt EN57s:
SKM Trójmiasto: EN57-768, EN57-1089, EN57-1094 & EN57-1116
Koleje Mazowieckie: EN57-1486, EN57-1566, EN57-1567 & EN57-1562
ZNTK "Mińsk Mazowiecki" works rebuilt these units. They too applied microprocessor controlled drive and electrodynamic braking.

EN57AKM 

In 2008, Koleje Mazowieckie decided to rebuild 10 trainsets into EN57AKM, during which LK450X6 AC motors developed by EMIT in Żychlin were installed. These engines were built in old housings, so that it was not necessary to change the final gears. Modernisations were carried out in the ZNTK "Mińsk Mazowiecki" plant (6 units in 2009–2010) and Newag Nowy Sącz (4 units in 2009), and the units modernised in this way were designated as EN57AKM.

At the same time, SKM Trójmiasto commissioned the rebuild of one EN71 unit based on similar assumptions – it was carried out in 2009 by Newag, and on 14–16 October 2009 the unit was presented at the TRAKO 2009 International Railway Fair in Gdańsk.

By July 2013, at a cost of PLN 351 million, another 21 EN57 units belonging to SKM Trójmiasto were to be rebuilt. This was to be carried out within 14 months by a consortium of Tabor Szynowy Opole (TS Opole) and Škoda Transportation; however, due to the bankruptcy of TS Opole, only one unit (EN57AKM-1718) was rebuilt. In the re-tender for the rebuild of the remaining 20 units for SKM Trójmiasto, the most advantageous offer was submitted by the consortium of Pesa Bydgoszcz SA and ZNTK "Mińsk Mazowiecki" SA, which undertook said rebuild for approx. PLN 124 million. They are equipped with air conditioning (only in the driver cabs), toilets in a closed system, CCTVs and passenger information system (on monitors and audiovisual).

EN57AKŁ 

Between 2011 and 2012, Newag rebuilt four EN57 units for Łódzka Kolej Aglomeracyjna on the basis of a contract awarded on 29 July 2011 worth PLN 31.4 million; these units were designated as EN57AKŁ. Deliveries lasted from December 2011 to May 2012. The rebuilt trains are units 1226, 1452, 1044 and 1479. The units are also equipped with air conditioning in both the driver cabs and passenger interiors, two toilets in a closed system and power sockets at the passenger seats. The driver's cab controls were also modernised, the appearance of the front of the cab was changed and the original sliding doors were replaced with plug doors.

EN57AL, EN57AKW, EN57AKD, EN57AKŚ, EN57AP, EN57FPS 

From 2011 to 2018, rebuilds into EN57AL (+ ALc & ALd), EN57AKW, EN57AKD, EN57AKŚ, EN57AP and EN57FPS took place in the same range or very similar to the above-mentioned EN57AKŁ. They are given various designations, e.g. EN57AL (the letter L was initially supposed to symbolise Lubelskie, now this designation can also be found on rebuilt Dolnośląskie, Mazowieckie, Opolskie, Pomorskie and Podlasie units), EN57AKW (letter W symbolising Wielkopolska) or EN57AKŚ (Ś symbolising Śląskie). The original motors are replaced with newer asynchronous ones (in the designation they are symbolised by the letter A), the trains are equipped with air conditioning in both the driver cabs and passenger interiors, ecological toilets in a closed system, blinds in windows, LCD monitors, power sockets and (on many 2013–2018 modernisations) free on-board Wi-Fi. Seats are replaced with ergonomic ones, the seating arrangement is changed and trains are equipped with a new braking system, improving the smoothness of driving. The AL/ALc/ALd versions for Lubelskie are equipped with on-board ticket machines, while the AKŚ units have on-board vending machines selling snacks and drinks for travellers.

EN57FPS (Feniks 57) refers to some of the last and most extensive "turbokibel" rebuilds of twenty EN57 units, done by H. Cegelski between 2015 and 2018 under contract by Polski Tabor Szynowy, Polregio and Koleje Śląskie.

Interior only (2010–present) 
Due to the higher cost of undertaking the aforementioned extensive rebuilds of EN57 units into "turbokibels", since 2010 less extensive modernisations have also been undertaken, primarily affecting their interiors with some slight exterior changes. To keep costs low oftentimes "turbokibel" features such as air conditioning, power sockets and sometimes CCTVs and on-board toilets are omitted from such modernisations.

EN57-1703 "ENdolino" 

In 2016, Koleje Dolnośląskie contracted ZNTK "Mińsk Mazowiecki" to refurbish EN57-1703, in which the area of the cab windshields were optically increased by applying black paint, which gave the front of the vehicle a modern look. For this reason, the unit was nicknamed "ENdolino".

Preserved units 

EN57-001 (the first production EN57 trainset), has since 2017 been preserved in Przeworsk under the protection of a conservator. Bearing in mind the value of the vehicle from the point of view of the history and development of the railway industry in Poland, the management board of Przewozy Regionalne had already in 2016 decided to withdraw the earlier decision to scrap this unit, which last saw revenue service in 2009.

See also 
Polish locomotives designation
Szybka Kolej Miejska
14WE A heavily reconstructed version of EN57, developed in mid-2000s

Resource 
Polish electric multiple units technical data, URL accessed on June 8, 2007
EN57 unofficial website, URL accessed on June 8, 2007
Mundkowa Galeria Kolejowa, retrieved on June 26, 2007.

References 

Electric multiple units of Poland
Electric multiple units of Slovenia
Electric multiple units of Croatia
Pafawag multiple units
3000 V DC multiple units